SpaceX Dragon C106 is a Dragon space capsule built by SpaceX. It is the first reused SpaceX Dragon capsule to be reflown into space, having its second launch in 2017. C106 was first used on CRS-4, and then used again for the CRS-11 and CRS-19 missions. It was the second capsule after C108 to be used a third time, marking a milestone in SpaceX's drive to reduce space launch costs through reusing hardware.

History 
C106 was built as the sixth production Dragon capsule. This new Dragon was launched in September 2014 for the CRS-4 mission to the International Space Station (ISS). It splashed down in October 2014, and was successfully retrieved. To prepare for its second flight, it had its heatshield replaced while the hull, avionics, and Draco thrusters were refurbished. The refurbished Dragon was relaunched in June 2017 for the CRS-11 mission to the ISS. It splashed down and was successfully recovered in July 2017. After undergoing another refurbishment, C106 was launched again for the CRS-19 mission.

Flights

See also 

 Falcon 9 booster B1029, the second SpaceX Falcon 9 booster to be reused
 Falcon 9 booster B1021, the first SpaceX Falcon 9 booster to be reused
 Falcon 9 booster B1019, the first SpaceX Falcon 9 booster to be successfully landed
 Gemini spacecraft No. 2, the first space capsule to be reflown
 Scaled Composites SpaceShipOne
 McDonnell Douglas DC-X
 Blue Origin New Shepard
 Space Shuttle

References

External links 
 

Individual space vehicles
SpaceX Dragon